John Strode Barbour may refer to:

John S. Barbour (1790–1855), U.S. Representative from Virginia 
John S. Barbour Jr. (1820–1892), U.S. Senator from Virginia
 John Strode Barbour (1866–1952), American newspaper editor, lawyer, mayor, and statesman

See also
John Barbour (disambiguation)